Karbinci is a municipality in the eastern part of North Macedonia. Karbinci is also the name of the village where the municipal seat is found. Karbinci Municipality is part of the Eastern Statistical Region.

Geography
The municipality borders Probištip Municipality, Češinovo-Obleševo Municipality and Zrnovci Municipality to the north and east, and Radoviš Municipality and Štip Municipality to the west and south.

Demographics
The 2021 Macedonian census recorded 3,420 residents of Karbinci Municipality. Ethnic groups in the municipality:

Inhabited places
The number of the inhabited places in the municipality is 29.

References

 
Municipalities of North Macedonia
Eastern Statistical Region